"Carolina Anthem" is a single released by Mark B. It was originally released four years prior when the Carolina Panthers were not winning as much even though the Players adopted the song as a favorite and regularly played the song during Practices. Due to the great 2015 season, and their being within Super Bowl reach, this song has become such a Carolina Panthers fan favorite that the song was re-released and extended.

References

Carolina Panthers
Football songs and chants
Year of song missing
2015 songs